John Andrews (1821–1???) was a United States Navy Ordinary Seaman received the Medal of Honor for his actions during the Korean Expedition. It is believed that in August 1872, he was discharged at Mare Island at his own request.

Medal of Honor citation
Ordinary Seaman Andrews' official Medal of Honor citation reads:

Stationed at the lead in passing the forts, Andrews stood on the gunwale on the Benicia's launch, lashed to the ridgerope. He remained unflinchingly in this dangerous position and gave his soundings with coolness and accuracy under a heavy fire.

See also
List of Medal of Honor recipients

References

External links
 

1821 births
Korean Expedition (1871) recipients of the Medal of Honor
United States Navy Medal of Honor recipients
United States Navy sailors
Year of death missing